The Candy Kid is a 1917 American silent comedy short (13 minutes) featuring Billy West and Oliver Hardy. It was produced by King Bee Comedies.

Plot
Two rival candy and ice-cream shops that face each other across a street try to steal each other's customers. White's shop advertises for a "strong brave man" and the Candy Kid is sixth in line. White wants them to bomb the other shop. The Candy Kid dresses as Charlie Chaplin's tramp.

The Candy Kid gets the job. He accidentally ignites the bomb fuse in White's shop and it is thrown from person to person until the fuse is put out. His job is then explained. He asks a policeman for a match. He has to throw the bomb away when the policeman comes back. It hits a woman on the head. The Kid throws the bomb away from the woman back across the street. It lands in White's rear room and explodes.

The woman takes the Kid into Hardy's shop to reward him. She asks Hardy to give him a job but he refuses. He gets pushed into the back shop and knocks into the cook. The cook starts to attack him but hits Hardy instead. The Kid gets the job and a uniform. He claims there are "flies" and starts swatting with a carpet beater bashing Hardy on the head.

Cast
 Billy West as the Candy Kid
 Ethel Cassity
 Oliver Hardy (as Babe Hardy) as rival proprietor
 Leo White as second rival proprietor
 Bud Ross as the Cook
 Leatrice Joy
 Gladys Varden
 Ellen Burford
 Martha Dean as the waitress
 Ethelyn Gibson as Chicken
 Naomi Burstein

See also
 List of American films of 1917
 Oliver Hardy filmography

References

External links

1917 films
1917 comedy films
1917 short films
Silent American comedy films
American silent short films
American black-and-white films
Films directed by Arvid E. Gillstrom
Articles containing video clips
American comedy short films
1910s American films
1910s English-language films